Ebenezer Johnson (1786–1849) was an American businessman and politician. He served as the first mayor of Buffalo, New York from May 1832 – March 1833 and 1834–1835.

Early life
Ebenezer Johnson was born in New England on November 7, 1786. He studied medicine in Cherry Valley, New York with Dr. Joseph White, a well-known physician of the time.

Career
He came to Buffalo in 1810 where he began a medical practice and eventually opened a drug store.

During the War of 1812, he was appointed "surgeon's mate," or assistant surgeon.  From 1823 on, Johnson had many business dealings including banking and bought property throughout the city.

On May 28, 1832 the first election in Buffalo took place and under the first city charter, the Common Council  had the power to elect the mayor. Dr. Ebenezer Johnson  was elected the first mayor of Buffalo  with a salary of $250 per year and his political affiliation was Democrat-Republican.  During his term he established the first hospital, the McHose House, for the care of cholera patients.  Johnson served as mayor from May 1832 to March 1833.  He declined a second term.  He did accept his re-election in 1834, serving a second and final term ending in 1835.

Dr. Johnson owned a parcel of land on Delaware Street, from Chippewa to Tupper, now known as "Johnson Park" and located in the West Village Historic District.  His land was approximately  total.  It was surrounded by a high fence and he allowed wild animals to live freely within its limits. His home was known as "Johnson Cottage," or just "the Cottage," and was a well-known place for socializing. The property included fruit orchards, vegetable gardens, flower beds, and elm trees.

After his second term, he moved to Tellico Plains, Tennessee, where he owned an iron ore mine with his brother, Elisha Johnson, who was a former mayor of Rochester, New York.

Personal life
On January 25, 1811, he married Sally M. Johnson at Cherry Valley. She died in June 1834, and on December 7, 1835, he married Lucy E. Lord.

Death
Johnson died at Tellico Plains on September 23, 1849.

References

1786 births
1849 deaths
Mayors of Buffalo, New York
People from Tellico Plains, Tennessee
New York (state) Democratic-Republicans
American military personnel of the War of 1812
Businesspeople from Tennessee
19th-century American politicians